Tczew railway station is a railway station serving the town of Tczew, in the Pomeranian Voivodeship, Poland. The station opened in 1852 and is located on the Warsaw–Gdańsk railway, Chorzów–Tczew railway and Tczew–Kostrzyn railway. The train services are operated by PKP and Przewozy Regionalne. Koleje Mazowieckie trains operate here during the summer.

This is an important station for passenger and freight traffic. It is a category A station. Every year more than 2.5 million passengers use the station.

The station used to be known as Dirschau.

Modernisation
In the period 2009–2012, the station, as part of the modernization of European corridor E65, underwent a thorough modernisation which included rebuilding the platforms, renewing the tracks and the signalling system.

Train services
The station is served by the following services:

EuroCity services (EC) (EC 95 by DB) (IC by PKP) Gdynia - Gdansk - Bydgoszcz - Poznan - Rzepin - Frankfurt (Oder) - Berlin
EuroCity services (EC) Gdynia - Gdansk - Malbork - Warsaw - Katowice - Bohumin - Ostrava - Prerov - Breclav - Vienna
Express Intercity Premium services (EIP) Gdynia - Warsaw
Express Intercity Premium services (EIP) Gdynia - Warsaw - Katowice - Gliwice/Bielsko-Biała
Express Intercity Premium services (EIP) Gdynia/Kołobrzeg - Warsaw - Kraków (- Rzeszów)
Intercity services (IC) Gdynia - Gdansk - Bydgoszcz - Poznań - Wrocław - Opole - Katowice - Kraków - Rzeszów - Przemyśl
Intercity services (IC) Gdynia - Gdańsk - Bydgoszcz - Toruń - Kutno - Łódź - Częstochowa - Katowice - Bielsko-Biała
Intercity services (IC) Gdynia - Gdańsk - Bydgoszcz - Łódź - Czestochowa — Krakow — Zakopane
Intercity services (IC) Gdynia - Gdańsk - Bydgoszcz - Poznań - Zielona Góra
Intercity services (IC) Gdynia - Gdańsk - Bydgoszcz - Poznań - Wrocław 
 Intercity services (IC) Łódź Fabryczna — Warszawa — Gdańsk Glowny — Kołobrzeg
Intercity services (IC) Szczecin - Koszalin - Słupsk - Gdynia - Gdańsk - Elbląg/Iława - Olsztyn
Intercity services (IC) Szczecin - Koszalin - Słupsk - Gdynia - Gdańsk - Elbląg - Olsztyn - Białystok
Intercity services (TLK) Gdynia Główna — Kostrzyn 
Intercity services (TLK) Gdynia Główna — Warszawa — Krakow — Zakopane 
Intercity services (TLK) Kołobrzeg — Gdynia Główna — Warszawa Wschodnia — Kraków Główny
Regional services (R) Tczew — Gdynia Chylonia 
Regional services (R) Tczew — Słupsk  
Regional services (R) Malbork — Słupsk  
Regional services (R) Malbork — Gdynia Chylonia 
Regional services (R) Chojnice — Czarna Woda - Starogard Gdanski - Tczew
Regional services (R) Chojnice — Tczew — Gdynia Główna 
Regional services (R) Elbląg — Gdynia Chylonia 
Regional services (R) Elbląg — Słupsk  
Regional services (R) Gdynia Chylonia — Olsztyn Główny
Regional services (R) Tczew — Smętowo 
Regional services (R) Gdynia Chylonia — Smętowo 
Regional services (R) Gdynia Chylonia — Laskowice Pomorskie 
Regional services (R) Gdynia Chylonia — Bydgoszcz Główna 
Regional services (R) Słupsk — Bydgoszcz Główna 
Regional services (R) Kwidzyn — Tczew
Regional services (R) Grudziądz — Tczew

Preserved locomotive

Steam Engine TKh 5699 is plinthed at the station.

Gallery

References

 This article is based upon a translation of the Polish language version as of October 2016.

External links

Railway stations in Poland opened in 1852
Railway stations in Pomeranian Voivodeship
Railway stations in Germany opened in 1852
Tczew County
1852 establishments in Prussia
1852 establishments in Germany